The 2011 Long Teng Cup was the 2nd staging of the Long Teng Cup, an international football competition held in Kaohsiung, Taiwan. The tournament took place from 30 September to 4 October 2011.

Competing teams
The 2011 staging of the competition featured the same national teams that competed in the inaugural edition in 2010. Hong Kong defended their title with their senior national team.  The team representing the Philippines included players from their under-23 national team, which will be competing at the 2011 Southeast Asian Games.  For Macau, their squad was a student based team which was the make up of their squad in last year's edition.

The following four national teams, shown with pre-tournament FIFA Rankings, participated in the tournament.

 (155) 
 (165)
 (172)
 (191)

Venue
All matches were played at the Kaohsiung National Stadium, a multi-purpose stadium located in Kaohsiung that is currently the largest stadium in the area in terms of capacity.

Matches
All times are National Standard Time – UTC+8.

Round-robin tournament

Awards

Goalscorers
4 goals
  Emelio Caligdong

2 goals

  Chan Siu Ki
  Lee Hong Lim
  Sham Kwok Keung
  Wong Chin Hung

1 goal

  Chen Po-liang
  Wu Chun-ching
  Chiu I-huan
  Au Yeung Yiu Chung
  Chan Wai Ho
  Cheng Lai Hin
  Kwok Kin Pong
  Lee Wai Lim
  Lo Kwan Yee
  Leong Ka Hang
  Phil Younghusband

References

External links
 CTFA event information webpage 

2010
2011 in Taiwanese football
2011–12 in Hong Kong football
2011 in Macau football
2011 in Philippine football